Cimarron Correctional Facility is a medium security prison in unincorporated Payne County, Oklahoma, located  southwest of the city of Cushing. It is owned and operated by CoreCivic, formerly Corrections Corporation of America, under contract with the United States Marshals Service.

The prison was built in 1997, and has a "contracted capacity"  for 1650 inmates.  Currently, of that number, 1,470 are medium-security and 180 are maximum-security beds.

CCA has also imported prisoners for detention here.  In March 2012, the Puerto Rico Department of Corrections and Rehabilitation agreed to send as many as 480 inmates to Cimarron, to alleviate overcrowded prisons on the island.  The three-year contract was ended prematurely in June 2013 after unit-wide fights and "disruptive events", and the inmates were sent back to Puerto Rico.

In June 2015 a fight among inmates sent eleven of them to the hospital.  The fight involved up to 300 people.  In September 2015 another fight took the lives of four inmates, all stabbed to death, and left another three wounded.  This was the worst such incident in state history.

On May 16, 2017, a guard deployed pepper spray on an inmate. Other inmates attacked the guard, and in the melee, an additional four guards were injured. All personnel involved required hospital treatment.

The prison was one of two operated by and four owned by CoreCivic in Oklahoma.

Due to reductions by the Oklahoma Department of Corrections in the number of inmates put in private prisons because of budgetary issues, CoreCivic announced closure of the facility in July 2020.

See also
 Oklahoma Department of Corrections

References

External links
 CoreCivic Cimarron Correctional Facility 

Prisons in Oklahoma
Private prisons in the United States
Prison uprisings in the United States
Buildings and structures in Payne County, Oklahoma
CoreCivic
1997 establishments in Oklahoma